Yonago Industrial Gymnasium is an arena in Yonago, Tottori, Japan.

References

External links
YONAGO INDUSTRIAL GYMNASIUM

Basketball venues in Japan
Indoor arenas in Japan
Shimane Susanoo Magic
Sports venues in Tottori Prefecture
Yonago, Tottori